The Damn Tour (stylized as The DAMN. Tour) was a concert tour by American rapper and songwriter Kendrick Lamar, in support of his fourth studio album, Damn (2017). The tour's North American leg began on July 12, 2017, in Glendale, Arizona and ended on September 2, 2017, in Miami. The European leg of the tour started on February 7, 2018, in Dublin and concluded on March 5, 2018, in Berlin. The tour's Oceanian tour started on July 10, 2018, in Perth, and concluded on July 30, 2018, in Seoul.

According to Pollstar, The Damn Tour grossed $41.4 million with 452,387 tickets sold in 36 shows only in North America.

Background 
Following a pair of Coachella gigs and a performance at Quebec City Summer Festival, the rapper brought his new album on the road in the summer of 2017. The first announcement had 17 dates across North America slowly adding to 20 after adding shows in Brooklyn and Los Angeles having Travis Scott and DRAM as the opening acts. The second announcement added 15 shows having YG as the opening act. On September 30, he added a leg of European dates to the tour with James Blake as the opening act.
On April 29, 2018, he added a leg of Oceanian dates to the tour.

Set list 
This set list is representative of the show on July 12, 2017, in Glendale. It is not representative of all concerts for the duration of the tour.

"DNA"
"Element"
"King Kunta"
"untitled 07  2014 – 2016"
"untitled 02  06.23.2014."
"Mask Off" (Future remix)
"Collard Greens"
"Swimming Pools (Drank)"
"Backseat Freestyle"
"Loyalty"
"Lust"
"Money Trees"
"M.A.A.D City"
"XXX"
"Pride"
"Love"
"Bitch, Don't Kill My Vibe"
"Alright"
"Humble"
Encore
"Feel"
"God"

Shows

Notes

References 

2017 concert tours
2018 concert tours
Concert tours of North America
Concert tours of the United States
Concert tours of Canada
Concert tours of Europe
Concert tours of the United Kingdom
Concert tours of France
Concert tours of Germany
Concert tours of Ireland
Kendrick Lamar